The annual election to the Labour Party's Shadow Cabinet (more formally, its "Parliamentary Committee") was conducted in October 1986. In addition to the 16 members elected, the Leader (Neil Kinnock), Deputy Leader (Roy Hattersley), Labour Chief Whip (Derek Foster), Labour Leader in the House of Lords (Cledwyn Hughes), and Chairman of the Parliamentary Labour Party (Jack Dormand) were automatically members.

As a result of the election, David Clark and Bryan Gould joined the cabinet, while Robin Cook and Robert Hughes lost their places.

Top 19 candidates are listed.

Footnotes
Notes

References

1986
1986 elections in the United Kingdom
October 1986 events in the United Kingdom